Straneck's tyrannulet (Serpophaga griseicapilla), also known as the monte tyrannulet and grey-crowned tyrannulet, is a small species of bird in the family Tyrannidae. It is found in woodland and open habitats with scatted bushes and trees in south-central South America, but the details are still unclear. It breeds in Argentina, but may also breed in Bolivia. In addition to these countries, it has been recorded as a non-breeding visitor in Paraguay, and possibly Brazil and Uruguay (it is unclear if it is a regular non-breeding visitor or only an accidental visitor to the last two countries). Visually it closely resembles the white-crested tyrannulet, but its voice is distinctive and its tail shorter. Considerable taxonomic confusion has surrounded this species, which for a period mistakenly was referred to by the scientific name Serpophaga griseiceps, a junior synonym of Serpophaga munda. Consequently, the Straneck's tyrannulet only received its scientific name in 2007 despite having been known since the early 1990s.

References

 Jaramillo, A. (2010) Recognize the newly described Serpophaga griseicapilla. South American Classification Committee.
 Straneck, R. (2007). "Una nueva especie de Serpophaga (Aves Tyrannidae)". Revista FAVE - Ciencias Veterinarias 6: 1–2.

External links
 Photos, videos and observations at Cornell Lab of Ornithologys Birds of the World
 Calls and songs on the xeno canto collection

Straneck's tyrannulet
Birds of Argentina
Straneck's tyrannulet